TULL-KUST is a trade union that organises employees in the customs service and coast guard of Sweden.

References

Trade unions established in 1899
Trade unions in Sweden
Swedish Confederation of Professional Employees